23rd NYFCC Awards
unknown(announced December 30, 1957)

Best Film: 
 The Bridgeon the River Kwai 
The 23rd New York Film Critics Circle Awards, honored the best filmmaking of 1957.

Winners
Best Film:
The Bridge on the River Kwai
Best Actor:
Alec Guinness - The Bridge on the River Kwai
Best Actress:
Deborah Kerr - Heaven Knows, Mr. Allison
Best Director:
David Lean - The Bridge on the River Kwai
Best Foreign Language Film:
Gervaise • France

References

External links
1957 Awards

1957
New York Film Critics Circle Awards, 1957
New York Film Critics Circle Awards
New York Film Critics Circle Awards
New York Film Critics Circle Awards